Mateus Asato (December 29, 1993) is a guitarist from Campo Grande, Brazil. He rose to fame by posting videos of himself playing guitar on Instagram, and has since amassed over one million followers. He has toured with several pop stars as a guitarist. Mateus also has his own signature guitar with Suhr Guitars.

Career 
In 2013 he attended the Musicians Institute in Los Angeles, California. His career began when industry professionals discovered him through his Instagram account. He then toured with Tori Kelly and Jessie J. Asato also began to do guitar clinics in South Korea and in Singapore. In 2019 Guitar Magazine named him one of the 50 most exciting young guitarists in the world. He has also played some shows in Las Vegas along with Bruno Mars. American musician John Mayer has said that Asato "is one of the best guitar players around.”

In February 2021, Asato shut down his popular Instagram account. He reopened it on 31 March 2022.

Signature guitar
The boutique guitar company, Suhr Guitars, released a signature guitar for Asato. At the 2020 Namm show Suhr guitars revealed a new Mateus Asato signature guitar would be released soon.

Awards
Brazilian guitar contest “Double Vision” winner. 500 contestants.
2014 Outstanding Guitar Player of Musician's Institute

Style 
He has developed his own fingerstyle method of picking, one heavily reliant on hybrid picking. His playing style incorporates jazz influences, double stops, and complex single-string and chord slides. Guitar World magazine called his style Neo Soul.

Personal life
His grandparents were of Japanese descent and came from Okinawa, Japan. He began playing guitar at ten. In 2013, when he was 19 years old, he moved to Los Angeles, California.

References

External links
Asato playing at NAMM Show 2020

Musicians from Brasília
Living people
Brazilian male guitarists
Japanese guitarists
Brazilian musicians of Japanese descent
Brazilian people of Okinawan descent
Progressive rock guitarists
21st-century guitarists
Blues guitarists
1993 births
21st-century Japanese male musicians